PHP is an open-source server-side scripting language.

PHP may also refer to:
 Parallel History Project, a website with information about the Cold War
 Partial hospitalization program, a program used to treat mental illness and substance abuse
 Penultimate hop popping, a function of certain routers in MPLS computer networks
 Percutaneous hepatic perfusion, a regionalized cancer treatment
 Pigeonhole principle, a fundamental mathematical principle
 Pizza Hut Park, the former name of Toyota Stadium in Dallas, Texas, US
 Primary Health Properties, a UK real estate investment trust
 Pulsating heat pipe, a heat-transfer device
 PHP Family, a Bangladeshi conglomerate
 PHP pistol, a Croatian-made pistol
 Philippine peso by ISO 4217 currency code
 People's Heritage Party, a political party in Ghana